Circular Breathing is the third Extended play by Australian singer-songwriter Kate Miller-Heidke. It was her first to be released with a major music company, Sony BMG.

The EP was supported by The Apartment Tour throughout 2006.

Singles
"Apartment" was the only single to be released from Circular Breathing in April 2006. There was a promotional music video made for the song which featured her and some other band members performing the song live.

Track listing

Charts

Release history

References

2006 EPs
EPs by Australian artists
Kate Miller-Heidke albums